David Aloua (born 24 April 1987) is a New Zealand professional boxer. As an amateur, he competed at the 2010 Commonwealth Games.

Aloua has peaked in the top 15 in the WBO, WBA, IBO, Boxrec and in the top 40 of the WBC.

Amateur career

Amateur boxing titles
2009 New Zealand Boxing Amateur Championship 91 kg
2010 New Zealand Boxing Amateur Championship 91 kg
Bronze Medal Commonwealth Amateur Boxing Championship 91 kg

Professional career
Aloua got the biggest win in his career when he fought Brad Pitt for the WBA Pan African, WBO Asia Pacific and WBC OPBF cruiserweight titles. Aloua won the fight by knockout in the fourth round.

Aloua fought Anthony McCracken twice as a pro. The first time was in April 2012, for the vacant World Professional Boxing Federation Asia Pacific cruiserweight title. Aloua won the bout by split decision. The second time was in November 2014, for the WBO Asia Pacific, WBC OPBF and WBA Pan African cruiserweight title. McCracken won the bout by technical knockout in the seventh round. After the second bout, Alouas team announce that there will be a third bout eventually, however nothing has come from it since then.

Professional boxing record

|-  style="text-align:center; background:#e3e3e3;"
|  style="border-style:none none solid solid; "|Res.
|  style="border-style:none none solid solid; "|Record
|  style="border-style:none none solid solid; "|Opponent
|  style="border-style:none none solid solid; "|Type
|  style="border-style:none none solid solid; "|Rd., Time
|  style="border-style:none none solid solid; "|Date
|  style="border-style:none none solid solid; "|Location
|  style="border-style:none none solid solid; "|Notes
|- align=center
|Lose
|12–3
|align=left| Kurtis Pegoraro
|
|
|
|align=left|
|align=left|
|- align=center
|Win
|12–2
|align=left| Filipo Fonoti Masoe
|
|
|
|align=left|
|align=left|
|- align=center
|Lose
|11–2
|align=left| Anthony McCracken
|
|
|
|align=left|
|align=left|
|- align=center
|Win
|10–1
|align=left| Brad Pitt
|
|
|
|align=left|
|align=left|
|- align=center
|Win
|9–1
|align=left| Junior Maletino Iakopo
|
|
|
|align=left|
|align=left|
|- align=center
|Win
|8–1
|align=left| Mosese Sorovi
|
|
|
|align=left|
|align=left|
|- align=center
|Lose
|7–1
|align=left| Daniel Ammann
|
|
|
|align=left|
|align=left|
|- align=center
|Win
|7–0
|align=left| Balazs Varga
|
|
|
|align=left|
|align=left|
|- align=center
|Win
|6–0
|align=left| Anthony McCracken
|
|
|
|align=left|
|align=left|
|- align=center
|Win
|5–0
|align=left| Monty Filimaea
|
|
|
|align=left|
|align=left|
|- align=center
|Win
|5–0
|align=left| Faimasasa Tavu'i
|
|
|
|align=left|
|align=left|
|- align=center
|Win
|4–0
|align=left| Hunter Sam
|
|
|
|align=left|
|align=left|
|- align=center
|Win
|3–0
|align=left| Walter Pupu'a
|
|
|
|align=left|
|align=left|
|- align=center
|Win
|2–0
|align=left| Henry Taani
|
|
|
|align=left|
|align=left| 
|- align=center
|Win
|1–0
|align=left| Jae Bryce
|
|
|
|align=left|
|align=left|

References

|-

|-

|-

|-

1987 births
Living people
Sportspeople from Thames, New Zealand
New Zealand male boxers
Cruiserweight boxers
Boxers from Auckland
Boxers from Melbourne
Fighters trained by Lolo Heimuli
Boxers at the 2010 Commonwealth Games
Commonwealth Games competitors for New Zealand